Anders Daniel Pontén (16 September 1934 in Skellefteå, Sweden – 12 January 2009 in Örebro, Sweden) was a Swedish author, journalist and actor.

Anders Pontén was the son of the doctor Johan Pontén and Elisabeth, née Hagströmer, as well as nephew to Gustaf Pontén and grandson of John Pontén. The family belonged to the clergyman family Pontén from Småland.

He worked at Stockholms-Tidningen in 1955, Nordvästra Skånes Tidningar in 1956, Nerikes Allehanda in 1958, Aftonbladet in 1960, Expressen in 1964, Sveriges Radio TV in Gothenburg 1967, in Örebro 1969 and at Sveriges Riksradio AB in Örebro from 1980. He was the producer of the radio program Riksronden  and various medical- and general historical programs. He was also involved as an actor in Örebro länsteater and TV-teatern and has his own tour guide recording at Örebro slott.

During the 1970s and 1980s, Pontén worked with the radio program Riksronden which was broadcast from Örebro. He was a host on the radio program Sommar during the years 1973, 1976 and 1977. Pontén also appeared as a priest in the film version of Nils Parling's Finnbastu which was produced by SVT Örebro in the early 1980s.

He was first married between 1957–1962 to the artist Lillan Berg Hagenfeldt (1936–2006), daughter of the engineer Edde Berg and Ebba, née Kaeding, and then from 1963 to Lillemor Gustafsson (1933–2005), daughter of auditor Gösta Gustafsson och Ingeborg Gustafsson.

Bibliography 
 1980 – Ponténs droppar – Medicinhistoria i fickformat ur TV2-serien Diagnos 
 1982 – Ponténs pärlor 
 1982 – Korvpapperet – Jubileumsskrift från Sibylla och AB Lithells
 1983 – Narrkåpor – Lättsinnigt plock ur historieboken 
 1984 – Muntra minnen 
 1984 – Liv och kniv – Lättsinnigt plock ur läkarhistorien 
 1992 – Örebro länslasarett 100 år – En jubileumsskrift
 1995 – Faster Titti, generalen och jag – och andra dråpliga episoder ur vår historia 
 1996 – Hej tomtegubbar! - Skrock och skrönor kring julen 
 1998 – Svensk historia dag för dag

Källor

External links 
 Anders Pontén in Libris

Swedish writers
Swedish actors
Swedish-language writers
1934 births
2009 deaths
20th-century Swedish journalists